Coelociontidae is a family of air-breathing land snails, terrestrial pulmonate gastropod mollusks in the clade Eupulmonata (according to the taxonomy of the Gastropoda by Bouchet & Rocroi, 2005).

This family has no subfamilies.

Genera

Genera within the family Coelociontidae include:
 Coelocion Pilsbry, 1904 - type genus of the family Coelociontidae
 Coelocion australis Forbes
 Perrieria Tapparone Canefri, 1878
 Perrieria clausiliaeformis Tapparone Canefri, 1878

References

External links